Zac Saddler (born 16 June 1999) is an Australian professional rugby league footballer who plays as a  forward for the Limoux Grizzlies in the Elite One Championship. 

He played for the Indigenous All Stars at representative level in 2020 and 2021.

Playing career
Saddler made his first grade debut in round 9 of the 2021 NRL season for Manly-Warringah against the New Zealand Warriors at Brookvale Oval.

During Manly's round 12 loss against Newcastle, Saddler was rushed to hospital with a depressed skull fracture.

On 6 October 2021, Saddler was released by the Manly club.

References

External links
Manly-Warringah Sea Eagles profile

1999 births
Living people
Australian rugby league players
Indigenous Australian rugby league players
Limoux Grizzlies players
Rugby league players from Bathurst, New South Wales
Rugby league second-rows
Indigenous All Stars players
Manly Warringah Sea Eagles players